M43 may refer to:

 M43 BZ cluster bomb
 M43 field cap, a piece of German headgear
 M-43 (Michigan highway), a state highway in Michigan
 M43 (Johannesburg), a Metropolitan Route in Johannesburg, South Africa
 M43 (Pretoria), a Metropolitan Route in Pretoria, South Africa
 M43 (Durban), a Metropolitan Route in Durban, South Africa
 M43 mortar, a Soviet weapon
 M43 Howitzer Motor Carriage, an American self-propelled artillery vehicle
 M43 motorway (Hungary), a Hungarian Motorway
 BMW M43, a 1991 automobile piston engine
 Dodge M43, the ambulance variant of the Dodge M37
 Messier 43, a nebula near the Orion Nebula
 M43, the original designation for the 7.62×39mm Soviet carbine and rifle round
 the 43rd Mersenne prime
 Micro Four Thirds system lens mount standard for mirrorless interchangeable lens digital cameras
 Model 43 grenade, a German hand grenade introduced during World War II
M43  Postcode in Greater Manchester 
M43 road (Johannesburg), a road in Johannesburg, South Africa